Adolphus Lewis Heermann (October 21, 1821 – September 27, 1865) was an American doctor, naturalist, ornithologist, and explorer. He travelled throughout the U.S. collecting samples and cataloging various species of birds, fish, reptiles, and plants. He participated in the fifth Pacific Railroad Survey as the surgeon and naturalist of a group led by Lt. Robert S. Williamson and reported on the various birds along the route.

Heermann was born in New Orleans, Louisiana, the oldest son of Lewis (Surgeon in the Navy, August 3, 1779 - May 1833) and Eliza. After the death of his father, his mother moved to Baltimore and then took them to Europe around 1836. After their education in Europe, Adolphus and his brother Theodore came back to New York in 1842. 

From 1862 he was suffering from locomotor ataxia, a symptom of syphilis and when Henry Dresser visited San Antonio in 1863, he was able to meet Heermann and the two went riding together on collecting trips. Heermann's legs had to be strapped into the saddle of his horse so that he would not fall off. Theodore wrote to Dresser about the death of Adolphus stating that he had gone out collecting alone, when his gun accidentally went off killing him.

Discoveries and namesakes
Heermann collected specimens of birds, animals, and plants in the western United States during his expeditions and sent them to specialists, mainly at the Academy of Natural Sciences of Philadelphia. Several new taxa from his collections were named after him:

Heermann's gull (Larus heermanni)
Heermann's kangaroo rat (Dipodomys heermanni)
Heermann’s song sparrow (Melospiza melodia heermani)
Heermann's tarweed (Holocarpha heermannii)

References

1821 births
1865 deaths
American naturalists
American ornithologists